A printer's mark, device, emblem or insignia is a symbol that was used as a trademark by early printers starting in the 15th century.

The first printer's mark is found in the 1457 Mainz Psalter by Johann Fust and Peter Schöffer. One of the most well-known old printer's marks is the dolphin and anchor,  first used by the Venetian printer Aldus Manutius as his mark in 1502.

The database Printers' Devices of the Ancient Book Section of the Library of the University of Barcelona, was launched in October 1998. The University of Florida libraries also provide digital access to printers' devices and include The University of Chicago devices that have appeared on the cover of their publication The Library Quarterly.

Printers' devices have been incorporated in American library buildings, as a reflection of the British Arts and Crafts Movement.

From 1931-2012 Library Quarterly featured 328 printer's marks with an article on the history of each mark.

See also
 Bookplate
 Colophon
 Factory mark
 Merchant's mark
 Union label

References

External links

 
 Roberts, W. (1893). Printer's marks: a chapter in the history of typography. London; New York: George Bell & Sons. Project Gutenberg Ebook #25663 Released Jun 1, 2008.
 Printers' marks from digitized rare books at the Linda Hall Library
Base de Typographie de la Renaissance, a database of circa 1100 marks and thousands of other printed ornaments
Index of The Library Quarterly covers, 1931 to date
 Signa vides. Researching and recording printers‘ devices. Papers presented on 17-18 March 2015 at the CERL Workshop, hosted by the National Library of Austria, Vienna, ed. by M. Scheibe / A. Wolkenhauer, London 2015 (CERL Studies) 
 Typographorum emblemata. The Printer’s Mark in the Context of Early Modern Culture, ed by Anja Wolkenhauer and Bernhard F. Scholz, Walter de Gruyter, Berlin/ NY 2018 (Schriftmedien 4) , an international handbook and bibliography.

Book design
Mark
Trademarks